Malovskaya is a rural locality (a village) in Posyolok Nikologory, Vyaznikovsky District, Vladimir Oblast, Russia. The population was 214 as of 2010. There are 6 streets.

Geography 
Malovskaya is located 25 km southwest of Vyazniki (the district's administrative centre) by road. Nikologory is the nearest rural locality.

References 

Rural localities in Vyaznikovsky District